The live streaming of video games is an activity where people broadcast themselves playing games to a live audience online. The practice became popular in the mid-2010s on the US-based site Twitch, before growing to YouTube, Facebook, China-based sites Huya Live, DouYu, and Bilibili, and other services. By 2014, Twitch streams had more traffic than HBO's online streaming service, HBO Go. Professional streamers often combine high-level play and entertaining commentary, and earn income from sponsors, subscriptions, ad revenue, and donations.

Both AAA and indie developers have circumvented rising development costs by utilizing the free advertising live streaming provides. Independent titles such as Fall Guys, Rocket League, and Among Us are examples of games that have experienced a huge increase in player base as a result of streaming. Esports have also gained significant traction and attention from the accessibility of live streaming, and streaming has even been used as a method to raise awareness of social issues and money for charity.

Live streaming offers the allure of transforming a hobby of playing a video game into a full career of streaming, but brings with it the risks associated with this added renown, whether they be inside the video game, like stream sniping, or in real life, like stalking and swatting. Additionally, the low bar of entry in terms of technology and audience allows for a wide variety of streamers and games to be broadcast.

Overview

History 
Tomoaki Hamatsu (浜津 智明) also known as Nasubi (なすび, "Eggplant") is credited as the first video game live streamer due to the fact that he won a PlayStation, a TV, and the video game Densha de Go! all through Magazine Sweepstakes during the game show Denpa Shōnen teki Kenshō Seikatsu. (Denpa Shonen Sweepstakes Life) The goal of the game was to win ¥1 million ($6894.50) in sweepstake prizes all whilst being naked and he could only use stuff he won for food, clothing, and entertainment. By November 1998 Nasubi became the first to livestream a video game after winning a PlayStation along with his TV and the video game. He ended up playing this game for 3 whole days straight before banning himself from it due to it distracting him from his goal.

The popularity of livestreaming video games began with WSBN, a shoutcasting station, video streaming a competitive Starsiege Tribes match via Windows Media Encoder to approximately 50 people in 2001. Own3d, an early esport streaming website based in Austria, operated between 2009 and 2013. It later became popular in the mid-2010s on sites such as Twitch. By 2014, Twitch streams had more traffic than HBO Go and eventually hastened the closure of Justin.tv, which Twitch had originally spun out of. In 2015, YouTube launched YouTube Gaming, a video gaming-oriented sub-site and app that intended to compete with Twitch. Other notable video-game oriented streaming websites include Microsoft's Mixer, which shut down in July 2020, Smashcast.tv, which was formed after the merging of Azubu and Hitbox.tv, the South Korea-based afreecaTV, and many China based sites like Huya Live, DouYu and Bilibili.

In August 2020, China based video sharing website and live streaming service Bilibili paid Riot Games $113 million for the exclusive rights to broadcast League of Legends World Championship, Mid-Season Invitational and League of Legends All Star for three years in China. It was the biggest deal in the video game live streaming market, and made China's video game live streaming market bigger than Twitch, YouTube Gaming, and Facebook Gaming combined, according to journalist Rod Breslau.

Impact on the video game industry 
Live streaming has brought attention to previously obscure video games such as Rocket League, Fall Guys, and Among Us. Rocket League, a vehicular soccer game developed by Psyonix, sold over 5 million copies after becoming one of the top 5 most-watched games on Twitch when it released in July 2015. The game eventually accumulated over 12 million players and earned itself a Twitch Rocket League Championship Series. In September 2020, Rocket League abandoned its traditional pricing scheme and became free-to-play.

This form of live streaming has become a popular form of advertising for video game developers, surpassing traditional mediums such as online magazines and traditional demos. Potential consumers are able to experience newly released video games without having to purchase them. Major multiplayer titles benefit from this free advertising, but more linear point-and-click titles, such as those from the now defunct Telltale Games, can suffer if the people watching the gameplay are satisfied without making a purchase.

The rise in large-scale “AAA” video game titles have resulted in increased prices for consumers and the prevalence of free-to-play titles containing microtransactions. Smaller developers have utilized crowdsourcing platforms such as GoFundMe alongside streaming services such as Twitch to advertise their product. In turn, digital storefronts such as Steam have become even more popular with features such as built-in streaming integration and Steam early access facilitating a growth in users. By developing games with live streaming in mind, developers can leverage these features and allocate their budget towards innovative gameplay rather than traditional advertising.

Older titles, such as Super Mario 64 and The Legend of Zelda: Ocarina of Time, have seen renewed popularity due to speedruns, or rapid completions, facilitated by live streaming. This has been a key component in diversifying live streaming audiences.

Impact on eSports 
With the ability for anyone to watch from home on their devices, eSports viewership reached 213 million in 2016 and continues to grow every year. Popular eSports titles include Call of Duty, Counter Strike: Global Offensive, Dota 2, Fortnite, League of Legends, and Overwatch. One of the biggest prize pools in eSports was for the Dota 2 tournament, The International, which totaled a pool of US$25 million in 2017.

Smaller video game communities, such as the Super Smash Bros Melee community, have benefited from the visibility they have gained from video game live streaming. In 2013, several members of the Super Smash Bros Melee community live streamed in order to raise money to become the eighth game featured at the prestigious tournament Evolution Championship Series and overturn a decision by Nintendo to ban the game from the event.

Social activism 
In December 2019, famous streamer, Dr. Lupo, hosted a 24-hour charity live stream to have all donations and earnings earned during the stream donated to St. Jude Children's Research Hospital. The stream managed to raise $2.3 million, with Twitch itself donating $1 million of the total. In 2020, American politician Alexandria Ocasio-Cortez live streamed herself playing the popular game Among Us with other streamers who have large followings in an effort to encourage people to vote in the 2020 United States presidential election.

Profession 
Video game livestreaming is an emerging industry, the rise of the industry has allowed many Internet companies to rise while also allowing many grassroots gamers to leap to become big anchors, bringing more employment opportunities for young people. Professional streamers often combine gameplay with highly knowledgeable or dexterous play and entertaining commentary. They can generate sufficient revenue from viewer subscriptions and donations, as well as platform advertisements and sponsorships from eSports organizations. An October 2017 report from SuperData Research estimated that more people subscribed to video game streams and Let's Play videos on YouTube and Twitch than for all of HBO, Netflix, ESPN, and Hulu, combined.

Benefits 
As a profession, video game live streaming allows people to play the games they love while supporting their livelihood. As they gain bigger followings by streaming consistently and marketing, streamers are able to take advantage of the tools within most streaming platforms, such as subscriptions, donations, or advertisements, to support themselves. On some live streaming platforms, such as Douyu and Huya Live, viewers can tip the streamers in the form of virtual gifting. Streamers can also become sponsored, or offer rewards in the form of competitions or games to the viewers in order to promote their channel and increase viewership and monetization. Some competitions offer large money prizes for the winner. A professional Fortine player, Bugha, won 3 million dollars at the Fortnite World Cup in July 2019. In addition, streams can control their work schedule and their success on their platform can give a strong sense of personal accomplishment. Video game live streaming appeals to many for the ability to transform a hobby of playing video games into a profitable career of streaming them, in addition to the social benefits of being in a position of renown with a large viewership and semi-celebrity status.

Risks 
Streamers run the risk of being victims of stalking, as is common with other public figures. For example, a teenage viewer showed up uninvited to a streamer's house and requested to stream with him after having saved up for a one-way transcontinental flight. Another risk to streamers is swatting, where someone makes a false report to police of serious criminal activity taking place at the streamer's residence, resulting in a raid by police, which is often captured live by the streaming service. Such activity can create serious risk to the streamer, and has even resulted in deaths. In the 2017 Wichita swatting, police officers killed a man named Andrew Finch at his Kansas home. Finch was the unintended victim of the swatting after two Call of Duty players on the same team got into a heated argument about a 1.50 bet. LAPD arrested 25-year-old serial-swatter Tyler Raj Barriss, known online as "SWAuTistic" and "GoredTutor36", in connection with the incident, who was later sentenced to 20 years in federal prison for the offense. In another instance, a streamer by the name Jamie Lynn Greenwood was swatted while playing Minecraft. Swatting is a dangerous act of high jinks that can become a serious problem for the people involved.

Stream sniping is a common tactic to gain an advantage in a video game by watching the live stream of an enemy player while playing. Several video game developers have taken measures against stream sniping, and video games such as Rust and Fortnite now hide the names of popular streamers.  In November 2018, live streamer Ninja controversially threatened to report a player who he thought had killed him in Fortnite by stream sniping. While stream sniping happens somewhat rarely for most streamers due to the countermeasures set by the games, as well as tactics set up by the streamers themselves like covering up the in-game map or setting a delay for the stream, there are cases, like for the popular Twitch streamer Forsen, where stream sniping plays a part in a streamer's entertainment and therefore the streamer allows it.

Entry 
Players involved in eSports can get into streaming by using their popularity or by using their honed skills and in-depth game knowledge during their livestream.  People on YouTube or other social media platforms often become streamers as well to interact more with viewers. Other types of people that enter streaming include video game creators and people who write articles or blogs about video games.

To build an audience, experienced streamers recommend that newer streamers stream a popular game because it is more likely to interest viewers.
Popular titles in the mid-2010s include League of Legends, Dota 2, first-person shooters such as Counter Strike: Global Offensive, and card games such as Hearthstone. Viewers are more interested in players who play and entertain well, offering jokes, pop culture, and current event commentary instead of repetitive gameplay. Streamers also recommend keeping a schedule so viewers know when to watch, self-promoting on social media, and holding giveaway contests to increase followers.

Streaming equipment 
Microphones are critical to live streaming because they allow streamers to vocally communicate with their audience. Webcams are also useful because they allow the audience to see streamers and recognize them. If using a webcam, many streamers have additional lighting to brighten up their faces when streaming to allow viewers to see them clearly. An ethernet cable is highly recommended for streamers because it minimizes stuttering while streaming.

Home video game consoles, such as the PlayStation 4, PlayStation 5, Xbox Series X and Xbox One, contain built-in streaming and optional camera integration for streamers to use. Streamers using computers use software such as Open Broadcaster Software or XSplit to upload a livestream to the Twitch servers. For streamers using laptops, many gaming laptops are coming with new graphics cards and better connectivity to help streamers to stream their gaming experiences.

List of video game live streaming websites

Active
The following is a list of sites that primarily focuses on video game live streaming, including broadcasts of eSports competitions, in addition to other types of content.

Defunct

Legal issues

Live streaming of video games has many of the same legal issues that Let's Play videos may have. First and foremost, such videos can be considered a copyright violation, though is argued to be protected by fair use defenses. Streamers with larger audiences can also promote the game before its release by receiving a copy of the game from the developer to play on their platform, which runs the risk of violating ethical business practices if they stand to make a substantial amount of income from this promotion.

Nintendo has generally taken a strong stance compared to other publishers for allowing their games to be streamed or recorded. Initially, they have used YouTube's Content ID system to register their games such that they can generate ad revenue from streaming videos and Let's Play videos. By about 2014, Nintendo crafted its Nintendo Creators Program, which would allow players providing live streams and Let's Plays of Nintendo games that sign onto the program to receive some monetization of these videos through YouTube. However, in September 2017, Nintendo changed the program specifically preventing affiliates from streaming video of Nintendo games, monetized or not, though non-affiliated accounts, and Let's Plays with commentary, remain unaffected. However, on November 28, 2018, Nintendo announced that the program was shutting down.

The playing of copyrighted music without proper permission may cause archived streams to be removed or muted. Streamers can also be suspended, due to complaints under laws such as the U.S. Online Copyright Infringement Liability Limitation Act, or automated content matching. More than 10 popular Twitch streamers, including Félix "xQc" Lengyel and Zachary "Sneaky" Scuderi, were banned for 24 hours for allegedly playing a song by Juice WRLD in June 2018. Some of the bans were lifted, with the artist's record label Interscope claiming that the ban was accidental. Even backlash from small streamers is on the rise. English live streamer PhatUnicorn420 uses music from his real life brother, music producer SampleTheChef. Even after rejecting and disputing over 200 video mutes to his channel, Twitch are still unable to identify Phat's claims and to stop them reoccurring. Twitch sent a letter to users in October 2020 stating that it would remove videos or channels that had copyrighted music on them, and that it could not stop streamers from facing punishments due to Digital Millennium Copyright Act (DMCA) violations.

See also 
 Gamecaster
 Online streamer
 Software vision mixer

References

Further reading